Romano Guardini (17 February 1885 – 1 October 1968) was a German Catholic priest, philosopher and theologian. He was one of the most important figures in Catholic intellectual life in the 20th century.

Life and work

Guardini was born in Verona, Italy, in 1885 and was baptized in the Church of San Nicolò all'Arena. His father was a dealer in eggs and poultry. Guardini had three siblings. The family moved to Mainz when he was one years old and he lived in Germany for the rest of his life. He attended the Rabanus-Maurus-Gymnasium. Guardini wrote that as a young man he was “always anxious and very scrupulous.” 

Fluent in Italian and German, he also studied Latin, Greek, French, and English. After studying chemistry in Tübingen for two semesters, and economics in Munich and Berlin for three, he decided to become a priest. He studied Theology in Freiburg im Breisgau and Tübingen. Impressed by the monastic spirituality of the monks of Beuron Archabbey, he became a Benedictine oblate, taking the name Odilio. Guardini was ordained a diocesan priest in Mainz by Georg Heinrich Kirstein in 1910. 

He briefly worked in a pastoral position at St. Christoph's Church, Mainz before returning to Freiburg to work on his doctorate in Theology under Engelbert Krebs. He received his doctorate in 1915 for a dissertation on Bonaventure. He completed his "Habilitation" in Dogmatic Theology at the University of Bonn in 1922, again with a dissertation on Bonaventure. Throughout this period he also worked as a parish priest at St. Ignatius, St. Emmeran's, and St. Peter's and served as chaplain to the Catholic youth movement. During World War I he served as a hospital orderly.

In 1923, he was appointed to a chair in Philosophy of Religion at the University of Berlin. In the 1935 essay "Der Heiland" (The Saviour) he criticized Nazi mythologizing of the person of Jesus and emphasized the Jewishness of Jesus. The Nazis forced him to resign from his Berlin position in 1939. From 1943 to 1945 he retired to Mooshausen, where his friend Josef Weiger had been a parish priest since 1917.

In 1945, Guardini was appointed professor in the Faculty of Philosophy at the University of Tübingen and resumed lecturing on the Philosophy of Religion. In 1948, he became professor at the University of Munich, where he remained until retiring for health reasons in 1962. That same year, he received the Erasmus Prize, an annual prize awarded by the board of the Praemium Erasmianum Foundation to individuals or institutions that have made exceptional contributions to culture, society, or social science in Europe.

Pope Paul VI offered to make Guardini a cardinal in 1965, but he declined.

Guardini died in Munich, Bavaria on 1 October 1968. He was buried in the priests’ cemetery of the Oratory of St. Philip Neri in Munich. His estate was left to the Catholic Academy in Bavaria that he had co-founded.

In December 2017, the Archdiocese of Munich and Freising opened the cause of canonization for Guardini, thus designating him a Servant of God.

Reputation and influence 
Guardini's books were often powerful studies of traditional themes in the light of present-day challenges or examinations of current problems as approached from the Christian, and especially Catholic, tradition. He was able to enter into the worldview of those such as Socrates, Plato, Augustine, Dante, Pascal, Kierkegaard, Dostoevsky and Nietzsche, and make sense of them for modern readers.

His first major work, Vom Geist der Liturgie (The Spirit of the Liturgy), published during the First World War, was a major influence on the Liturgical Movement in Germany and by extension on the liturgical reforms of the Second Vatican Council. He is generally regarded as the father of the liturgical movement in Germany, and in his "Open Letter" of April 1964 to Mgr. Johannes Wagner, the organizer of the Third German Liturgical Congress in Mainz, he "raises important questions regarding the nature of the liturgical act in the wake of individualism, asking whether it is possible for twentieth-century Christians really to engage in worship. Is it possible to 'relearn a forgotten way of doing things and recapture lost attitudes', so as to enter into the liturgical experience?." It was his glad hope that after the call by the Second Vatican Council for liturgical reform, the Catholic Church might shift its focus from the merely ceremonial, important though that was, to a broader idea of true liturgical action—action that "embraced not only a spiritual inwardness, but the whole man, body as well as spirit." He himself gave an example of his meaning: A parish priest of the late 19th century once said (according to Guardini's illustration), "We must organize the procession better; we must see to it that the praying and singing is done better." For Guardini, the parish priest had missed the point of what true liturgical action is. He should instead have asked, "How can the act of walking become a religious act, a retinue for the Lord progressing through his land, so that an 'epiphany' may take place."

As a philosopher he founded no "school", but his intellectual disciples could in some sense be said to include Josef Pieper, Luigi Giussani, Felix Messerschmid, Heinrich Getzeny, Rudolf Schwarz, Jean Gebser, Joseph Ratzinger (later Pope Benedict XVI), and Jorge Mario Bergoglio (later Pope Francis). In the 1980s Bergoglio began work on a doctoral dissertation on Guardini, though he never completed it. Pope Francis cited Guardini's The End of the Modern World eight times in his 2015 encyclical Laudato si', more often than any other modern thinker who was not pope. Hannah Arendt and Iring Fetscher were favourably impressed by Guardini's work. He had a strong influence in Central Europe; in Slovenia, for example, an influential group of Christian socialists, among whom Edvard Kocbek, Pino Mlakar, Vekoslav Grmič and Boris Pahor, incorporated Guardini's views in their agenda. Slovak philosopher and theologian Ladislav Hanus was strongly influenced in his works by Guardini, whom he met personally, and promoted his ideas in Slovakia, writing a short monograph. In 1952, Guardini won the Peace Prize of the German Book Trade.

The 1990s saw something of a revival of interest in his works and person. Several of his books were reissued in the original German and in English translation. In 1997 his remains were moved to the Sankt Ludwig Kirche, the University church in Munich, where he had often preached.

Guardini's book The Lord, published in English translation in the late 1940s, remained in print for decades and, according to publisher Henry Regnery, was "one of the most successful books I have ever published." The novelist Flannery O'Connor thought it "very fine" and recommended it to a number of her friends.

Selected bibliography 
 Gottes Werkleute. Briefe ueber Selbstbildung, 1921
 Von heiligen Zeichen, 1922–1925
 Der Gegensatz, 1925
 Grundlegung der Bildungslehre, 1928
 Das Gute, das Gewissen und die Sammlung, 1929
Vom Sinn der Kirche, 1933
 Christliches Bewusstsein, 1935
 Das Wesen des Christentums, 1937
Dante-Studien. 1. Band: Der Engel in Dantes Göttlicher Komödie 1937
 Welt und Person, 1939
 Der Tod des Sokrates, 1943
 Die Lebensalter, 1944
 Freiheit, Gnade, Schicksal, 1948
 Das Ende der Neuzeit, 1950
 Sorge um den Menschen, 1962
 Begegnung und Bildung, (together with O. F. Bollnow), 1956
Dante-Studien. 2. Band: Landschaft der Ewigkeit (München 1958)
Dante-Studien. 3. Band: Dantes Göttliche Komödie. Ihre philosophischen und religiösen Grundgedanken (Vorlesungen). Aus dem Nachlaß herausgegeben von Martin Marschall. Grünewald / Schöningh, Mainz / Paderborn 1998,  /

Major works translated into English
 Pascal: A Study in Christian Consciousness. Cluny Media, 2022. 
 The End of the Modern World. Sheed & Ward, 1957. More recently in a revised edition by ISI Books, 1998. 
 The Art of Praying: The Principles and Methods of Christian Prayer. Sophia Institute Press, 1994. 
 The Lord. Regnery Publishing, 1996.  with introduction by Cardinal Joseph Ratzinger
 The Essential Guardini: An Anthology, edited by Heinz R. Kuehn. Liturgy Training Publications, 1997. 
 The Spirit of the Liturgy. Crossroad Publishing, 1998. 
 Living the Drama of Faith. Sophia Institute Press, 1999. 
 Learning the Virtues. Sophia Institute Press, 2000.  
 The Death of Socrates. Kessinger Publishing, 2007. 
 The Rosary of Our Lady. Sophia Institute Press, 1998.
 Sacred Signs. CreateSpace Independent Publishing Platform, 2015. 
The Humanity of Christ: Contributions to a Psychology of Jesus. Cluny Media, 2018. 
The Human Experience: Essays on Providence, Melancholy, Community, and Freedom. Cluny Media, 2018. 
The Meaning of the Church. Cluny Media, 2018. 
The Spirit of the Liturgy. Cluny Media, 2018.  
The Death of Socrates. Cluny Media, 2019. 
Rilke's Duino Elegies: An Interpretation. Cluny Media, 2019.  
The Last Things. Cluny Media, 2019.  
The Conversion of Augustine. Cluny Media, 2020.

References

External links
 
 
 Romano Guardini (National Institute for the Renewal of the Priesthood)
 The Spirit of the Liturgy by Romano Guardini

20th-century German Catholic theologians
Italian emigrants to Germany
Clergy from Mainz
1885 births
1968 deaths
Knights Commander of the Order of Merit of the Federal Republic of Germany
Recipients of the Pour le Mérite (civil class)
German male non-fiction writers
German Servants of God
20th-century venerated Christians
20th-century German philosophers
20th-century German Roman Catholic priests